Coccolo is a surname. Notable people with the surname include:

Dante Coccolo (born 1957), French bicycle racer
Luca Coccolo (born 1998), Italian footballer